Campo Limpo de Goiás is a municipality in central Goiás state, Brazil.  It separated from the municipality of Anápolis in 1997.

The distance to the state capital, Goiânia, is 75 km and connections are made by BR-153, passing through Anápolis, and then taking GO-330.

Demographic and Political Data
IBGE statistical microregion: Anápolis Microregion
Population density in 2007: 35.83 inhabitants/km2
Urban population in 2007:  4,534
Rural population in 2007:  1,062
Eligible voters in 2007: 4,798
Mayor:  Joaquim Silveira Duarte
Vice-mayor:  Carlos Alberto de Carvalho

Economy
The economy is based on cattle raising (17,500 head in 2006), both for meat and dairy.   There are also banana, corn, rice, sugarcane, and soybean plantations.
Industrial establishments: 14
Retail commerce establishments: 36
Automobiles: 299 (2007)
Banks: none (August 2007)

Agricultural data 2006
Number of Farms:  228
Total area:  10,413 ha.
Area of permanent crops: 503 ha.
Area of perennial crops: 1,122 ha.
Area of natural pasture:  6,839 ha.
Area of woodland and forests:  1,231 ha.
Persons dependent on farming:  2,350
Farms with tractors: 38
Number of tractors:  53
Cattle herd:  17,500 head IBGE

Health and education
Schools in activity: 2 (2006)
Classrooms: 26
Teachers: 62
Total number of students: 1,622
Hospitals: none (2007)
Walk-in health clinics: 1 (2005)

See also
List of municipalities in Goiás

References

Frigoletto
Highway distances from Goiânia

Municipalities in Goiás